Gapa may refer to:
Gapa, Kuyavian-Pomeranian Voivodeship, a village in north-central Poland
GAPA Launch Site and Blockhouse, the birthplace of the United States Air Force supersonic missile flight test program
Gapa, informal name of the Parachutist Badge in Poland
Gapa, a diminutive of the Russian male first name Agafon
Gapa, a diminutive of the Russian male first name Agafonik
Gapa, a diminutive of the Russian male first name Agap
Gapa, a diminutive of the Russian female first name Agapa
Gapa, a diminutive of the Russian male first name Agapit
Gapa, a diminutive of the Russian female first name Agapiya
Garmisch-Partenkirchen, a town and winter sports venue in the German Alps

Military
 SAM-A-1 GAPA, an early U.S. surface-to-air missile, developed, manufactured and tested by Boeing

See also
Garmisch-Partenkirchen, a mountain resort in Bavaria, Germany